Anne Frances Murphy (born December 19, 1986) is a Canadian actress. She is best known for her starring roles as Alexis Rose in the CBC sitcom Schitt's Creek (2015–2020) and Allison McRoberts in the AMC dark comedy series Kevin Can F**k Himself (2021–2022). For her performance in the former series, she garnered critical acclaim and won a Primetime Emmy Award and a Screen Actors Guild Award, while also receiving nominations for four Canadian Screen Awards, three Screen Actors Guild Awards, two Critics' Choice Television Awards, and one Golden Globe Award.

Early life 
Murphy was born in Ottawa, Ontario, on December 19, 1986. Both her parents were teachers. She attended high school at Elmwood School in Ottawa, where she performed in stage productions. 

Murphy enrolled at Queen's University for one year before transferring and receiving a degree in theatre performance at Concordia University. She then trained at the Canadian Film Centre Actors' Conservatory.

She moved to Los Angeles at age 22 to pursue an acting career.

Career

Murphy made her acting debut in the crime-thriller television film Lethal Obsession (2007). She continued to perform small and extra roles in various other Canadian films, such as Story of Jen (2008), Lick (2010), and A Windigo Tale (2010). She also appeared in several Canadian television series, including Good God (2012) and Rookie Blue (2012). She has said that, during this time, she was a "struggling actress" who "was begging to go in for comedies" but her resume had only drama. 

She also appeared in numerous American television series, including The Beautiful Life: TBL (2009), Blue Mountain State (2010), Against the Wall (2011), and Beauty & the Beast (2012).

Murphy was considering quitting acting as a career path when, in 2013, she auditioned for and got the role of Alexis Rose on the CBC sitcom Schitt's Creek. She recalled in 2020, "My house had just burnt down, I had like, $3 in my bank account, I hadn't worked in close to two years. And I had just blown my very first screen test—like blown it, blown it, blown it… I found myself crying in the Pacific Ocean, a very snotty cry, and the universe was like, 'Don't do this anymore. This is not for you!' But then, two days later, I got the audition for Schitt's Creek." She played the character for the series' entire run of six seasons, from January 2015 until April 2020.

After six years in Montreal, Murphy moved to Toronto, where she co-created and starred in The Plateaus, a 2015 web series about four insufferable musicians. Her performance in the show earned her a nomination at the 2016 Canadian Screen Awards for Best Performance in a Program or Series Produced for Digital Media. At the same ceremony, Murphy was nominated for Best Actress in a Comedy Series for her performance in Schitt's Creek. She earned the same nomination for this performance in 2018, 2019, and 2020. It also brought her nominations for Best Supporting Actress in a Comedy Series at the 2019 Critics' Choice Television Awards, Outstanding Performance by an Ensemble in a Comedy Series at the 2019 Screen Actors Guild Awards, and Best Actress in a Breakthrough Role at the 2019 Gracie Awards, the latter of which she won. In September 2020, she won the Primetime Emmy Award for Outstanding Supporting Actress in a Comedy Series for her performance in the final season of Schitt's Creek.

In February 2020, she was cast as the lead in AMC's television dark comedy series Kevin Can F**k Himself. Due to the COVID-19 pandemic, production of the show was delayed by several months, but resumed in September 2020.

In 2020, Murphy appeared in a holiday advertising campaign for Hudson's Bay department stores opposite her Schitt's Creek co-star Catherine O'Hara. She also appeared in a series of ads for meal-kit company HelloFresh, including in a soap-opera style web series titled Hungry Hearts. In January 2021, she appeared in a commercial for Nintendo Switch, appearing in one scene opposite her real-life mother. In September 2021, she appeared in an advertising campaign for the FDA-approved hormone-free contraceptive Phexxi.

In 2022, she portrayed young Ruth in the Netflix series Russian Doll.

Activism and advocacy 
Murphy is an ambassador for the global relief agency Care Canada. In 2019, she visited Jordan to learn about Care's efforts to empower women and girls in the region. In January 2021, she donated proceeds from the auction of her first red carpet dress to Encampment Support Network, a not-for-profit that helps Toronto's unhoused persons.

Personal life 
Murphy married singer and musician Menno Versteeg, lead singer of the bands Hollerado and Anyway Gang, in August 2011. In 2013, a fire occurred at their home; the two were uninjured but lost most of their belongings.

Murphy has a tattoo of James Stewart's silhouette on her wrist, citing his "heartbreaking, sweet, and funny" performance in Harvey as one of her influences.

Filmography

Film

Television

Music videos

Discography

Singles

Awards and nominations

References

External links 
 

1986 births
Living people
21st-century Canadian actresses
Actresses from Ottawa
Canadian film actresses
Canadian television actresses
Canadian Film Centre alumni
Concordia University alumni
Outstanding Performance by a Supporting Actress in a Comedy Series Primetime Emmy Award winners